The genus Paradigalla consists of two species of birds-of-paradise. Both are medium-sized black birds with blue and yellow facial wattles.

The name of the genus is derived from two words, the Paradisaea and Gallus, the junglefowl of pheasant family. The two paradigallas and the four junglefowls exhibits facial wattles.

Species
 Long-tailed paradigalla, Paradigalla carunculata
 Short-tailed paradigalla, Paradigalla brevicauda

External links
 
 

 
Bird genera
 
 
Taxa named by René Lesson